Zelippistes benhami is a species of sea snail, a marine gastropod mollusc in the family Capulidae, the cap snails.

Distribution
This species is distributed along New Zealand.

References

 Powell A. W. B., William Collins Publishers Ltd, Auckland 1979 
 

Capulidae
Gastropods of New Zealand
Gastropods described in 1902